Tipula furca is a species of large crane fly in the family Tipulidae.

Subspecies
These two subspecies belong to the species Tipula furca:
 Tipula furca credula
 Tipula furca furca

References

Tipulidae
Articles created by Qbugbot